Zollingeria borneensis is a species of plant in the family Sapindaceae. It is endemic to Borneo, and is threatened by habitat loss.

References

borneensis
Endemic flora of Borneo
Trees of Borneo
Flora of Sabah
Critically endangered plants
Taxonomy articles created by Polbot